Vient de paraître is a French film from 1949, directed by Jacques Houssin, written by Michel Duran, and starring by Pierre Fresnay. The film also features Louis de Funès.

Plot
Five authors compete with each other and encounter different personal issues.

Cast 
 Pierre Fresnay: Moscat
 Blanchette Brunoy: Jacqueline
 Hélène Petit: Anne-Marie
 Franck Villard: Maréchal
 Henri Rellys: Marc Fournier
 Jean Brochard: Brégaillon
 Jean Ayme: Bourgine
 Louis de Funès: uncredited
 Jacques Mattler: journalist
 Roger Vincent: writer
 André Carnège: Félix
 Pierre Ringel: Henri

References

External links 
 

1940s French-language films
French black-and-white films
French romantic drama films
1949 romantic drama films
1949 films
1940s French films